Elazığ station is a station in the city of Elazığ, Turkey. TCDD Taşımacılık operates two intercity trains to Ankara or Van, and Adana as well as one regional train to Tatvan.

The station was completed, by the Turkish State Railways, on 1 July 1934 and inaugurated on 11 August with a large ceremony. Unlike Malatya station, Elazığ was not built in the Art deco style instead consisting of a generic station building. When the railway was completed east to Tatvan, the Elazığ station building was enlarged to accommodate new offices and passenger traffic.

References

External links
Station information
Fırat ekspresi tren saatleri

Railway stations in Elazığ Province
Railway stations opened in 1934
1934 establishments in Turkey